Persiwa Wamena U-20 is an Indonesian football club based in Wamena, Papua Province, Indonesia. They play in the top division in Indonesian football, Liga Indonesia. Their home stadium is Pendidikan Stadium. Its nickname "The Highlander" referred its home ground that located around Jayawijaya Mountain.

Squad

Former player
  Fred Ferdinando Mote
  Alan Arthur Aronggear

All time top scorer

Achievements & honors
Indonesia Super League U-21 
6th Place (1): 2010

See also 
 Persiwa Wamena
 Indonesia Super League U-21

External links
 Fans Official Blog 
 Profile at liga-indonesia.co.id

Football clubs in Indonesia

de:Persiwa Wamena
fr:Persiwa Wamena
id:Persiwa Wamena
pt:Persiwa Wamena